Haplochromis schubotziellus is a species of cichlid found in Lake George and the Kazinga Channel and possibly also in Lake Edward.  This species reaches a length of  SL.

References

schubotziellus
Cichlid fish of Africa
Fish described in 1973
Taxonomy articles created by Polbot